Michael Damian Smith (born 28 April 1959) is a former Australian rules footballer who played with South Melbourne in the Victorian Football League (VFL) and with  in the South Australian National Football League (SANFL).

Career

South Melbourne
Smith played his football as a centre half-forward. He kicked five goals on his South Melbourne debut, in round 10 of the 1977 VFL season, against Collingwood. During the 1981 season, Smith was cleared to Richmond but wouldn't play a senior VFL game at the club.

He was embroiled in controversy in 1981 when it was discovered that he had mistakingly provided information on his permit to play for South Melbourne. The discrepancy was in his address. His grandmother's South Melbourne address was on the permit but in reality lived in Caulfied, which was in St Kilda's zone. As a result South Melbourne were fined heavily and the ladder was altered, to give Hawthorn the four points they missed out on when they played South Melbourne earlier in the season, when Smith made two appearances before joining Richmond. This decision was later reversed.

West Adelaide
Mike Smith moved to Adelaide in 1982 to join the West Adelaide Football Club. Over the next five seasons he played in 85 games and kicked 182 goals for The Bloods. He played on the half-forward flank in Wests 1983 SANFL Grand Final win over Sturt at Football Park. While at The Bloods, Smith was coached by two of the greats of South Australian football, Neil Kerley (1982–94) and John Cahill (1985-86).

Family
His father, Stan Smith, was also a South Melbourne footballer. His son, Matthew was drafted by The Adelaide Crows in 2000 at selection 48.Jim McShane, his great grandfather, played for Geelong.

References

1959 births
Australian rules footballers from Victoria (Australia)
Sydney Swans players
West Adelaide Football Club players
Living people